Kenichi Itō (いとう けんいち, Itō Kenichi) may refer to:
Kenichi Ito (athlete), Japanese athlete known for running 100 meters on all four limbs
Kenichi Itō (political scientist) (born 1938), Japanese political scientist and diplomat
 Kenichi Ito, guitarist in the band Iceman

See also
Itō (name)